Sukhoy Log is a rural locality (a village) in Posadskoye Rural Settlement, Kishertsky District, Perm Krai, Russia. The population was 140 as of 2010. There are 4 streets.

Geography 
Sukhoy Log is located 14 km northeast of Ust-Kishert (the district's administrative centre) by road. Penki is the nearest rural locality.

References 

Rural localities in Kishertsky District